The lifesaving events  at the 2009 World Games in Kaohsiung was played between 23 and 25 July. 96 athletes from 8 nations participated in the tournament. The competition took place in Kaohsiung Swimming Pool for pool events and in Sizihwan Bay for beach events. For both men and women, there were four individual events in pool lifesaving, three individual events in beach lifesaving, and an overall team event combining five non-medal team and relay events in pool and beach disciplines.

Participating nations

Medal table

Events

Men

Women

References

External links
 International Life Saving Federation
 Lifesaving on IWGA website
 Results

 
2009 World Games
2009